Tham Mae Lana is a karst cave located in Mae Lana, Pang Mapha District, Mae Hong Son Province, Thailand. It is abundant in stalactites, and is home to a subterranean stream that is populated by cavefish, including the waterfall climbing cave fish. The cave is difficult to traverse and can only be accessed with the assistance of local guides.

See also 
 List of caves
 Speleology

References

Caves of Thailand
Geography of Mae Hong Son province